The 2012–13 Presbyterian Blue Hose men's basketball team represented Presbyterian College during the 2012–13 NCAA Division I men's basketball season. The Blue Hose, led by 24th year head coach Gregg Nibert, played their home games at the Templeton Physical Education Center and were members of the South Division of the Big South Conference. They finished the season 8–24, 4–12 in Big South play to finish in last place in the South Division. They lost in the first round of the Big South tournament to Campbell.

Roster

Schedule

|-
!colspan=9| Exhibition

|-
!colspan=9| Regular season

|-
!colspan=9| 2013 Big South Conference men's basketball tournament

References

Presbyterian Blue Hose men's basketball seasons
Presbyterian